The University of Northern Iowa (UNI) is a public university in Cedar Falls, Iowa. UNI offers more than 90 majors across the colleges of Business Administration, Education, Humanities, Arts, and Sciences, Social and Behavioral Sciences and graduate college. The fall 2019 enrollment was 10,497. More than 88 percent of its students are from the state of Iowa.

History

The University of Northern Iowa was founded as a result of two influential forces of the nineteenth century. First, Iowa wanted to care for orphans of its Civil War veterans, and secondly, Iowa needed a public teacher training institution. In 1876, when Iowa no longer needed an orphan home, legislators Edward G. Miller and H. C. Hemenway started the Iowa State Normal School.

The school's first building opened in 1867 and was known as Central Hall. The building contained classrooms, common areas, and a living facility for most of the students. It was also a home to the college's first principal, James Cleland Gilchrist. The building was the heart and soul of the school, allowing students to study courses of two-year, three-year, and four-year degrees. In 1965, a fire destroyed Central Hall, and school faculty and Cedar Falls citizens donated over $5,000 to start building Gilchrist Hall.

The school has been known under the following names:
Iowa State Normal School, 1876–1909
Iowa State Teachers College, 1909–1961
State College of Iowa, 1961–1967
University of Northern Iowa, 1967–present

From 2014 through 2018 the UNI hosted the Midwest Summer Institute: Inclusion and Communication for All, a two-day conference on facilitated communication sponsored by the Inclusion Connection and Syracuse University's Institute on Communication and Inclusion. In 2018, just before the fifth annual conference held on June 18–19, a group of over thirty "researchers and academics around the globe" signed a letter to the UNI asking the university to cancel the conference because the practice has been "thoroughly discredited over 25 years ago". The letter also stated that "overwhelming scientific evidence suggests that facilitated communication constitutes a serious violation of the individual, civil and human rights of people with disabilities, robbing them of the opportunity to communicate independently with available innovative technologies." Proponents of the method have defended the conference. The National Council Against Health Fraud released an article that was critical of the school's support of Facilitated Communication and summarized the American Speech–Language–Hearing Associations draft position on Facilitated Communication as a harmful pseudoscience. The 2018 conference was held as scheduled, but the university withdrew its support shortly thereafter. On October 24, 2018, Provost Jim Wohlpart announced that the UNI would no longer host the conference. Critics were pleased with this result but are skeptical of UNI's statement that the workshop was hosted by an outside agency, as UNI continues to employ "current staff members who trained with Douglas Biklen.

Presidents 
Since its founding, the university has had eleven presidents.

 James Cleland Gilchrist, 1876–1886
 Homer Horatio Seerley, 1886–1928
 Orval Ray Latham, 1928–1940
 Malcolm Poyer Price, 1940–1950
 James William Maucker, 1950–1970
 John Joseph Kamerick, 1970–1983
 Constantine William Curris, 1983–1995
 Robert D. Koob, 1995–2006
 Benjamin J. Allen, 2006–2013
 William Ruud, 2013–2016
 Mark Nook, 2017–present

Academics
University of Northern Iowa Colleges include:
 Business
 Education
 Humanities, Arts and Sciences
 Social and Behavioral Sciences
 Graduate College

Student statistics
The fall 2019 total semester enrollment was 10,497, the lowest since 1975. Its freshman enrollment was 1,495. UNI president Mark Nook attributed the decline to increasing tuition, saying "we're too expensive". The incoming class of 2016 marked the most diverse class in UNI's history with 11.2 percent minority students. Minority students now account for just over 10 percent of UNI's student body.

Study Abroad Center
UNI provides an opportunity for the students to study in 25+ countries and select from over 40 programs. It is also available to all students attending the university. The mission of the Study Abroad Center at the University of Northern Iowa is to provide service and leadership in international education to UNI students, faculty, staff, the community and the State of Iowa.

Culture and Intensive English Program
The Culture and Intensive English Program (CIEP) is an intensive program in English for non-native speakers.  It is designed to prepare students for academic work at the undergraduate or graduate degree level. University of Northern Iowa students are also encouraged to participate in the Conversation Partner Program to help foreign students with their English ability and foster cross-cultural relationships while gaining mutual understanding.

North American Review

The university is the publisher of The North American Review (called the NAR), a celebrated literary magazine that began originally in Boston in 1815. Its past editors have included James Russell Lowell, Charles Eliot Norton, and Henry Adams; while among its past contributors are Mark Twain, Henry James, Joseph Conrad, Walt Whitman, Kurt Vonnegut, Joyce Carol Oates, Guy Davenport and Margaret Atwood. In 1968, when the magazine was purchased by UNI, Robley Wilson was appointed editor, a position he continued in until his retirement in 2000. The current editors are Rachel Morgan, Jeremy Schraffenberger, Grant Tracey, and Brooke Wonders.

Teaching and Research Greenhouse
The University of Northern Iowa Teaching and Research Greenhouse is a greenhouse complex incorporating botanical gardens for research and education. It is located on the campus of the University of Northern Iowa in Cedar Falls, Iowa.

The greenhouse contains plants from many ecotypes, including 250 tropical plants, an extensive collection of arid climate plants, and the  Aquatic Learning Center.

Athletics 

The school's mascot is the Panther. They participate in the NCAA's Division I (I-FCS for football) in the Missouri Valley Football Conference, the Missouri Valley Conference (MVC) for most other sports, and the Big 12 Conference for wrestling. The major arena on campus is the UNI-Dome, currently the home of the football team. The Dome also serves as a venue for many local concerts, high school football playoffs, trade shows, and other events. In 2006, the university opened a new arena, the McLeod Center, to serve as the home for several athletic programs, including volleyball and men's and women's basketball.

UNI Athletics has enjoyed great success lately with the men's basketball team competing in the NCAA tournament three consecutive times in 2004, 2005, 2006, again in 2009 and 2010 and in 2015 and 2016. On March 20, 2010, the men's basketball team defeated the heavily favored, top-seeded Kansas Jayhawks to advance to the NCAA Sweet Sixteen. It was the school's first appearance in the Sweet Sixteen. The Jayhawks were favored to win the NCAA championship. Their Cinderella potential ended with a loss to Michigan State in the Sweet Sixteen, 59–52. The win over Kansas earned them the 2010 ESPY Award for Best Upset.
Jacqui Kalin helped lead the women's basketball team to consecutive NCAA Tournament berths, as the team won back-to-back MVC Tournament titles. In 2010-11 she was named the Jackie Stiles MVC Player of the Year.  In 2012-13 she led the league in scoring (19.5 ppg; a school record), had the fourth-highest season free throw percentage in NCAA Division 1 history-and the highest of any senior (95.5%), and was again named the Jackie Stiles MVC Player of the Year. For her career Kalin was first all-time at UNI in scoring (2,081), 3-point field goals made (265), free throws made (484), and free throw percentage (.920; the NCAA Division 1 career record.

The football team has been ranked in the I-AA (FCS) top 25 almost every year for the last two decades. The team appeared in the I-AA championship game in 2005, only to lose a close game to the Appalachian State Mountaineers. During 2007, the team was ranked #1 in the country by the TSN FCS poll for several weeks. The football team went undefeated in 2007 with an 11–0 record, a first for any school in the 23-year history of the Gateway conference. In 2001 and 2002 the volleyball team reached the NCAA Sweet 16 round, and in 2006 made it to the second round, and has competed in the tournament numerous times. The track team is also very successful (usually ranked in the top 25), as are the wrestling and volleyball teams.

The University of Northern Iowa wrestling team won the NCAA Division I national championship as ISTC in 1949 and NCAA Division II national championships in 1975 and 1978. They competed in the Western Wrestling Conference until 2012, when UNI became an associate member of the Mid-American Conference since the MVC is a non-wrestling conference. In 2017, UNI wrestling joined the Big 12 Conference. In 1977 the women's softball team won the AIAW national championship.

Bryce Paup won the Defensive Player of Year Award by the Associated Press in 1995. In 1999 and 2001, UNI alumnus Kurt Warner was named NFL MVP by the AP.

During the 2014–2015 season, the men's basketball team ended the regular season ranked #11 by the AP Poll, the highest ranking in school history, and #9 by USA Today.

Campus buildings
Baker Hall - Faculty offices. Formerly an all-male residence hall, demolished in 2014 (replaced by a parking lot)
Bartlett Hall - Faculty offices. Formerly a residence hall.
Bender Hall - Coed Residence Hall (Towers Complex)
Begeman Hall - Newly Renovated Physics Building - opened October 5, 2007
Biology Research Complex
Communication Arts Center - Location of studios of Iowa Public Radio stations KUNI-FM (news and music) and KHKE-FM (classical). Houses the Communication Sciences and Disorders Department and the faculty offices of the Department of Theatre.
Campanile - Clocktower on campus built in 1926, landmark of UNI and included in many university logos
Campbell Hall - Coed (formerly female only) residence hall. During the early months of the COVID-19 pandemic, this hall was used as the quarantine facility. It is now abandoned.
Curris Business Building
Center for Energy & Environmental Education
Center for Educational Technology
Center for Urban Education - Located in Waterloo
Commons - Event space containing ballrooms and meeting rooms. Also houses the 23rd Street Market. 
Dancer Hall - Coed Dormitory (Towers Complex). Contains only single rooms.
Gallagher-Bluedorn Performing Arts Center
Gilchrist Hall - Administration building. Closed until 2008 due to arson fire during homecoming, Fall 2005, now reopened
Greenhouse Annex - Part of the McCollum Science Hall
Hagemann Hall - Coed Dormitory (formerly all female, part of Quads Complex)
Industrial Technology Center - Academic Building
Innovative Teaching and Technology Center - Previously known as the East Gymnasium. Former Women's Gym. Remodeling was completed late Spring 2006
Kamerick Art Building - Academic Building; houses the University of Northern Iowa Gallery of Art
Latham Hall - Academic Building
Lawther Hall - Coed Upperclassmen Residence Hall. Reopened for the Fall of 2017 after closing for renovations in May 2015.
Lang Hall - The oldest academic building on campus, constructed in 1900.  Houses the Department of Communication and Media. Also houses the Interpreter's Theatre. This space often produces original work written and directed by faculty and students.
Maucker Student Union - home of UNI's student-run radio station, KULT 94.5 FM and the Northern Iowan newspaper. 
McLeod Center - Home of UNI Men's and Women's Basketball, Volleyball, and Wrestling
McCollum Science Hall - Academic Building housing the science departments.
Museum - Natural Science and Anthropology collections, Rural Schools collection, Marshall Center School, main collection and exhibits located on the first floor of Rod Library
Native Roadside Vegetation Center
Nielsen Fieldhouse, Former gymnasium of Malcolm Price Laboratory School (Special Education Offices and to get your Teacher Name Tags)
Noehren Hall - Coed residence hall (Part of Quads Complex)
Panther Village - Apparment-Style residence buildings for juniors and seniors. Will be open to sophomores beginning in the Fall of 2018.
Redeker Center - Center of Quads Complex. Houses UNI Department of Residence and Piazza Dining Center
Residence on the Hill (ROTH) - Coed Suite Style Residence Hall for Upperclassmen
Rider Hall - Coed (formerly male only) residence hall (Part of the Quads Complex)
Rod Library - Library, UNI Museum, Special Collection & University Archives
Russell Hall - Academic building and auditorium housing the Music departments
Sabin Hall - Academic Building
Schindler Education Center - Academic Building housing the education departments
Seerley Hall - Home of the Office of the President. Also an Academic Building, home to the History department
Shull Hall - Coed (formerly male only) Dormitory, recently remodeled for upperclassmen only (Part of Quads Complex). Contains only single rooms.
Student Health Center-Student Health Clinic, Counseling Center, Student Disability Services, Violence Intervention Services.
Student Services Center - Attached to Bartlett Hall, formerly known as East Bartlett
Strayer-Wood Theatre - Theatre that also houses the theater department of UNI.  Home of Theatre UNI. The theater was named after Hazel Strayer and Stanley Wood, two influential former faculty members. Also houses a black box, the Bertha Martin Theatre. According to department legend, the facility is haunted (like many theatres) by a ghost named Zelda. This ghost is believed to have been a student who died after falling from the catwalks during a production of Romeo and Juliet.
Towers Center - Home of the Rialto Dining Center
UNI-Dome - Stadium with seating for 16,000+. Home of UNI Football.
Wellness Recreation Center - Contains an aquatic center, climbing wall, track, and racquetball courts.
Wright Hall - Academic Building housing the Mathematics Department
West Gymnasium - Home of the UNI Military Science program (ROTC) and men's wrestling practice facility. Former home of UNI women's basketball and women's volleyball.

Gallery

Student life

Student newspapers 

Students Offering, 1888–1889
Normal Eye, 1892–1911
College Eye, 1911–1967
Northern Iowan, 1967–present

Fraternity and sorority life

Fraternities

Kappa Sigma
Pi Kappa Alpha
Sigma Alpha Epsilon
Sigma Phi Epsilon
Lambda Theta Phi

NPC sororities

Alpha Delta Pi
Alpha Xi Delta
Alpha Phi
Gamma Phi Beta
Alpha Sigma Tau

Transportation
UNI students may ride public transportation provided by the Metropolitan Transit Authority of Black Hawk County for $0.75 a ride with a student ID.

Notable people

Alumni
 William R. Clabby – journalist and editor for The Wall Street Journal, winner of a Gerald Loeb Award, and an executive at various Dow Jones news subsidiaries.
 Lorinne Crawford, actress and dancer
 Brittni Donaldson, professional basketball coach
 David Glawe, former Under Secretary of Homeland Security for Intelligence and Analysis
 Jane Elliott, American antiracist and diversity educator 
 Carolyn Hunt, First Lady of North Carolina
 David Johnson, professional football player
Bryce Paup, former professional football player
 Jacqui Kalin (born 1989), American-Israeli professional basketball player
 Chris Klieman, current Kansas State head football coach
 Brian Meyer, member of the Iowa House of Representatives
 Nick Nurse, professional basketball coach
 Duane Slick, fine art painter and professor at Rhode Island School of Design
 Ed Thomas, high school football coach
 Carter F. Nordman, alumnus, member of the Iowa House of Representatives from the 19th district

Faculty
 Donna Alvermann, former professor of education, now distinguished professor and researcher in education at the University of Georgia
 Jeremy Beck, composer, associate professor of Composition & Theory (1992–98)
 Harry Brod, former professor
 Herb Hake, television personality
 James Hearst, poet and former professor
 Miguel Franz Pinto, vocal coach, conductor, and pianist
 Mildred Hope Fisher Wood, faculty and prior alumnus of same college
 Loree Rackstraw, literary critic and memoirist
 Leland Sage, former professor
 Norm Stewart, former men's basketball coach who went on to become a coach at the University of Missouri
 Robert James Waller, alumnus, former professor and Dean of College of Business Administration, author of The Bridges of Madison County
 Norma Wendelburg, composer

References

External links 

 

 
University of Northern
Educational institutions established in 1876
Education in Black Hawk County, Iowa
Buildings and structures in Cedar Falls, Iowa
Tourist attractions in Black Hawk County, Iowa
1876 establishments in Iowa